Oleksii Koliadych (born 27 February 1998) is a Polish sprint canoeist.

He comes from Kherson and moved to Poland in 2015. He has been representing Poland since 2017.

The greatest success in his senior career was a gold medal in the K-1 200 m at the 2022 World Championships. In the same year, he also won a bronze medal at the European Championships in Munich.

His club is KS Admira Gorzów Wielkopolski.

References

External links

1998 births
Living people
ICF Canoe Sprint World Championships medalists in kayak
Polish male canoeists
21st-century Polish people